Salem Abdulaziz Al Sabah (born 1 November 1951) is a Kuwaiti economist and politician who served as deputy prime minister and minister of finance from 4 August 2013 to January 2014. He is a member of the Kuwaiti ruling family, Al Sabah.

Education
Al Sabah was born on 1 November 1951. He graduated from the American University of Beirut in 1977 receiving a degree in economics.

Career
Following his graduation Al Sabah started his career at the Central Bank of Kuwait in 1977 and served in various posts. He was the governor of the Central Bank of Kuwait from 1986 to February 2012. During his tenure he adopted reformist policies, and held the following positions: chair of Institute of Banking Studies, deputy governor at the Arab Monetary Fund and board member of Kuwait Investment Authority. He resigned from the post after criticizing the Kuwaiti government's spending policies. Mohammad Al Hashel succeeded him as governor in March 2012.

On 4 August 2013, Al Sabah was appointed both deputy prime minister and finance minister. He replaced Mustafa Al Shamali as finance minister. As finance minister, Al Sabah also headed the Kuwait Investment Authority.

In October 2013, Al Sabah publicly stated that the economy of Kuwait could grow only if administrative reforms were realized. His tenure ended in January 2014 when Anas Khalid Al Saleh was appointed finance minister.

References

20th-century Kuwaiti businesspeople
21st-century Kuwaiti businesspeople
1951 births
American University of Beirut alumni
Finance ministers of Kuwait
House of Al-Sabah
Governors of the Central Bank of Kuwait
Living people
Leaders of organizations